Frederick Winsor may refer to:
 Frederick Albert Winsor (1763–1830), German inventor
 Frederick Winsor (surgeon) (1829–1889), Civil War surgeon, and physician in Massachusetts

See also
 Lord Frederick Windsor (born 1979), British financial analyst